Sharif Street (born March 29, 1974) is an American politician and attorney. He is a Democratic member of the Pennsylvania State Senate who has represented the 3rd district since 2017. In 2018, Street was elected Vice-Chair of the Pennsylvania Democratic Party under Chairwoman Nancy Patton Mills of Allegheny County, and was elected Chair of the Pennsylvania Democratic Party on June 18, 2022, the first person of color to fill that roll.

Street is a supporter of criminal justice reform, environmentally-friendly energy production, cannabis legalization and equity education finance. 
He is the son of former Philadelphia Mayor John F. Street and the nephew of former State Senator Milton Street.

Early political involvement 
Throughout the early 2000s, Street was known for his cultural pride and long locks, which he kept even while campaigning. In 2004, Street was elected as a Delegate to the Democratic National Convention committed to John Kerry for President.

Career 
As a student at the University of Pennsylvania School of Law, Street directed a Town Watch group in Philadelphia and has continued to serve the community in numerous positions since, starting both Philadelphia Green Communities and Urban Solution, serving as managing director of the Housing Association of Delaware Valley; serving on the board of the North Central Philadelphia Empowerment Zone's Housing Trust Fund; the North Central Empowerment Zone's Community Advisory Committees for Housing, Crime, Public Safety and Economic Development; and current member of Philadelphia's African and Caribbean Immigrant Affairs Commission. He also served as Chief Legislative Advisor to the Democratic Chair of the Housing and Urban Development Committee, Senator Shirley Kitchen.

Pennsylvania State Senate 
Street was elected to the State Senate in 2016. He currently serves as a member of the Pennsylvania Commission on Sentencing and the Joint Legislative Air and Water Pollution Control and Conservation Committee.

Committee assignments 
 Agriculture and Rural Affairs
 Appropriations
 Banking and Insurance, Democratic Chair
 Local Government
 State Government, Democratic Chair

Pennsylvania Democratic Party 
In 2022, Street was elected Chair of the Pennsylvania Democratic Party after serving as vice-chair to Chairwoman Nancy Patton Mills of Allegheny County.

2022 U.S. Senate election 
On April 1, 2021, Street filed as a candidate for the Democratic nomination in the 2022 United States Senate election in Pennsylvania. He ended his campaign in January 2022.

References

External links
Profile at the Pennsylvania State Senate
Sharif Street for Senate

|-

1974 births
2020 United States presidential electors
20th-century African-American people
21st-century African-American politicians
African-American state legislators in Pennsylvania
Central High School (Philadelphia) alumni
Living people
Morehouse College alumni
Democratic Party Pennsylvania state senators
People from Philadelphia
Politicians from Philadelphia
Street family of Pennsylvania
University of Pennsylvania alumni
Pennsylvania Democratic Party chairs